This is a list of Montana Grizzlies football players in the NFL draft.

Key

Selections

Notable undrafted players
Note: No drafts held before 1920

References

Montana

Montana Grizzlies NFL draft